Artem Chesakov (born 20 October 1993) is a Russian diver. He competed at the 2013 Summer Universiade and 2013 World Aquatics Championships in the Men's synchronized 10 metre platform.

References

Russian male divers
Living people
1993 births
World Aquatics Championships medalists in diving
Universiade medalists in diving
Universiade silver medalists for Russia
Medalists at the 2013 Summer Universiade